Tritonia primorjensis is a species of dendronotid nudibranch. It is a marine gastropod mollusc in the family Tritoniidae.

References

External links 
 http://clade.ansp.org/obis/search.php/42345

Tritoniidae
Gastropods described in 1971